Michelle Rifenberg (born January 30, 1957) is an American politician and homemaker who served as a member of the Minnesota House of Representatives from 1997 to 2002.

Background 
A native of La Crescent, Minnesota, Rifenberg received her Bachelor of Science degree from Viterbo University and was a homemaker. She served in the Minnesota House of Representatives from 1997 to 2002 as a Republican.

References

1957 births
Living people
People from La Crescent, Minnesota
Viterbo University alumni
Women state legislators in Minnesota
Republican Party members of the Minnesota House of Representatives
21st-century American politicians
21st-century American women politicians